Heather Lee Mitchell  (born 1958) is an Australian actress, appearing in Australian productions of stage, television and film. She is a graduate of NIDA (National Institute of Dramatic Art). She is best known for her leading role in the 1990s television show Spellbinder.

Career

Television
Mitchell is well known for her performance as Ashka in the Australian/Polish co-productions of Spellbinder (1995), and Spellbinder: Land of the Dragon Lord (1997). The series was a popular children's fantasy program first broadcast in 1995.

Other television series include: the miniseries Bodyline (1984), Land of Hope (1986), Embassy (1992) and A Country Practice. In 1998, she starred in the miniseries drama The Day of the Roses, in which she played a victim of the 1977 Granville rail disaster. She has also appeared in episodes of Five Mile Creek (1984), Rake (2010), Miss Fisher's Murder Mysteries (2013), and Ms Fisher's Modern Murder Mysteries (2019). In 2021, she played Birdie in The Unusual Suspects.

Stage
Mitchell is a foundation director and board member of the Sydney Theatre Company (STC). She first appeared at the STC in 1981 performing scenes of Shakespeare's Henry IV, Part 1 with Andrew Tighe for a workshop. She has since appeared in dozens of productions for several Australian theatre companies and has contributed to Terence Crawford's 2005 book Trade Secrets: Australian Actors and Their Craft.

Personal life

Mitchell was made a Member of the Order of Australia in the 2020 Australia Day Honours for "significant service to the performing arts, and to the community."

Theatre

{| class="wikitable"
!Year !! Play !! style=max-width:10em | Author(s) !! Notes
|-
|1982 || You Can't Take It with You || George S. Kaufman, Moss Hart || with Geoffrey Rush
|-
|1982 ||  || Luigi Pirandello || with Peter Carroll, Hugo Weaving, Geoffrey Rush
|-
|1982 || Macbeth || William Shakespeare || directed by Richard Wherrett, with John Bell, Colin Friels, Hugo Weaving
|-
|1983 || The Fields of Heaven || Dorothy Hewett || with Lex Marinos
|-
|1983 || The Cherry Orchard || Anton Chekhov || with John Howard
|-
|1985 || The Doll Trilogy: Kid Stakes and Other Times || Ray Lawler || with Harold Hopkins
|-
|1986 || No Worries || David Holman || Adapted into a film in 1994
|-
|1987 || No(h) Exit || No Exit by Jean-Paul Sartre, The Lady Aoi and Hanjo from Five Modern Noh Plays by Yukio Mishima
|-
|1987 || Blood Relations || David Malouf || with John Wood
|-
|1988 || 1841 || Michael Gow || with Gillian Jones
|-
|1989 || A Dream Play || August Strindberg || directed by 
|-
|1989 || All My Sons || Arthur Miller || directed by Gale Edwards
|-
|1990 || The Secret Rapture || David Hare || with Hugo Weaving. Pamela Rabe
|-
|1990 || Burn This || Lanford Wilson || with Richard Roxburgh; directed by Wayne Harrison
|-
|1992 || The Homecoming || Harold Pinter || with Richard Roxburgh and Warren Mitchell
|-
|1993 || Two Weeks with the Queen || directed by Wayne Harrison
|-
|1993 || Coriolanus || William Shakespeare || with John Howard
|-
|1998 || A Delicate Balance || Edward Albee || directed by Simon Phillips, with Michael Craig
|-
|2000 || The White Devil || John Webster || directed by Gale Edwards, with Hugo Weaving, Angie Milliken
|-
|2001 || Bye Bye Birdie || Music: Charles Strouse, words: Lee Adams ||
|-
|2003 || The Real Thing || Tom Stoppard || directed by Robyn Nevin, with Andrew Tighe
|-
|2007 || Self Esteem || Brendan Cowell || with Toby Schmitz; directed by Brendan Cowell
|-
|2007 || Hamlet || William Shakespeare || as Gertrude, with Brendan Cowell as Prince Hamlet and Barry Otto as Polonius; directed by Marion Potts
|-
|2010 || True West || Sam Shepard || directed by Philip Seymour Hoffman
|-
|2011 || Neighbourhood Watch || Lally Katz || with Robyn Nevin and Kris McQuade; directed by Simon Stone<ref>{{cite web|url=https://belvoir.com.au/productions/neighbourhood-watch/|title=Neighbourhood Watch', productions|publisher=Belvoir|date=July–August 2011|access-date=17 October 2022}}</ref>
|-
|2012 || Never Did Me Any Harm || devised by Force Majeure || with Marta Dusseldorp; directed by Kate Champion
|-
|2012 || Les Liaisons Dangereuses || Christopher Hampton || with Hugo Weaving and Pamela Rabe; directed by Sam Strong
|-
|2013 || Rosencrantz and Guildenstern Are Dead || Tom Stoppard || as Gertrude
|-
|2014 || Strictly Ballroom || Baz Luhrmann, Craig Pearce and Terry Johnson|| as Shirley Hastings
|-
|2016 || Hay Fever || Noël Coward ||
|-
|2017 || Away || Michael Gow || directed by Matthew Lutton
|-
|2017 || Cloud Nine || Caryl Churchill || as a young boy  the boy's mother; directed by Kip Williams
|-
|2018 || Top Girls || Caryl Churchill || as Pope Joan
|-
|2018 || Still Point Turning: The Catherine McGregor Story || Priscilla Jackman || as Cate McGregor
|-
|2018 || The Harp in the South, Part One and Part Two || Ruth Park, Kate Mulvany || directed by Kip Williams
|-
|2022 || RBG: Of Many, One || Suzie Miller || as Ruth Bader Ginsburg
|}

Filmography

Film

Television

Awards and nominations
Mitchell won the Sydney Theatre Award for best performer in a leading role in a mainstage production for her portrayal of Ruth Bader Ginsberg in RBG: Of Many, One. Australian Academy of Cinema and Television Arts Awards 

 References 

External links
 
 
 "Heather Mitchell" by Melanie Tait, One Plus One, 3 October 2019, ABC News

Australian stage actresses
Australian film actresses
Australian television actresses
Living people
1958 births
National Institute of Dramatic Art alumni
Helpmann Award winners
Members of the Order of Australia